Imma arsisceles is a moth in the family Immidae. It was described by Edward Meyrick in 1937. It is found in South Africa.

References

Endemic moths of South Africa
Moths described in 1937
Immidae
Moths of Africa